The 2016–17 Håndboldligaen, known as the 888ligaen for sponsorship reasons, is the 81st season of the Håndboldligaen, Denmark's premier Handball league.

Team information 

The following 14 clubs compete in the Håndboldligaen during the 2016–17 season:

Personnel and kits
Following is the list of clubs competing in 2016–17 Håndboldligaen, with their manager, kit manufacturer and shirt sponsor.

Regular season

Standings

! There's a new relegation playoff made in November 2014

Schedule and results

No. 1-8 from the regular season divided into two groups with the top two will advance to the semifinals

Winner's playoff

Group 1

Group 2

Playoff

Semifinal

! Best of three matches. In the case of a tie after the second match, a third match is played. Highest ranking team in the regular season has the home advantage in the first and possible third match.

3rd place

! Best of three matches. In the case of a tie after the second match, a third match is played. Highest ranking team in the regular season has the home advantage in the first and possible third match.

Final

! Best of three matches. In the case of a tie after the second match, a third match is played. Highest ranking team in the regular season has the home advantage in the first and possible third match.

Relegation playoff
No. 12-13 from Håndboldligaen and no. 2-3 from the first division is meet each other for the last 2 seats. The winner stays in the league. the loser relegated to Division 1,  

! Best of three matches. In the case of a tie after the second match, a third match is played. Highest ranking team in the regular season has the home advantage in the first and possible third match.

Group 1

Group 2

Number of teams by regions

Top Goalscorer

Regular season

Overall

All Star Team

Regular season
Goalkeeper:  Mikael Aggefors (AAL)
Left Wing:  Magnus Bramming (TTH)
Left Back:  Jacob Holm (REH)
Centre Back:  Sander Sagosen (AAL)
Pivot:  Bjarte Myrhol (SKJ)
Right Back:  Kasper Søndergaard (SKJ)
Right Wing:  Kasper Kildelund (TTH)

Overall
Goalkeeper:  Kapser Larsen (MTH)
Left Wing:  Magnus Landin Jacobsen (KIF)
Left Back:  Sander Sagosen (AAL)
Centre Back:  Allan Damgaard Espersen (BSV)
Pivot:  Bjarte Myrhol (SKJ)
Right Back:  Niclas Kirkeløkke (GOG)
Right Wing:  Kasper Kildelund (TTH)

References

External links
 Danish Handball Federaration 

2016–17 domestic handball leagues
Handboldligaen
Handball competitions in Denmark
2017 in Danish sport